FC Pakhtakor-2 is an Uzbek professional football club, based in the capital Tashkent. Currently, it plays in the Uzbekistan First League. It is a farm club of FC Pakhtakor.

History
Pakhtakor-2 is feeder of first team. In 2012 Pakhtakor-2 plays in First League and Uzbek Cup.
On 3 April 2012 club was renamed to Pakhtakor-2 Chilanzar.

On 24 July 2012, club head coach Numon Khasanov resigned his position and was appointed as head coach of Pakhtakor Youth team. A new head coach of Pakhtakor-2-Chilanzar became Ilhom Mo'minjonov who worked before as head coach at NBU Osiyo.

In 2014 club was renamed to it old name Pakhtakor-2.

Managerial history

References

External links
Official website 

Association football clubs established in 2012
Sport in Tashkent
Pakhtakor-2
2012 establishments in Uzbekistan
Pakhtakor Tashkent FK